Bindschadler Glacier is a glacier in the northwest part of Royal Society Range, Victoria Land, flowing north between Table Mountain and Platform Spur to join Emmanuel Glacier. It was named by the Advisory Committee on Antarctic Names in 1992 after glaciologist Robert A. Bindschadler of the NASA Goddard Space Flight Center; from 1983 a principal investigator for United States Antarctic Research Program studies of the West Antarctic Ice Sheet including dynamics of ice streams in the Siple Coast area, their interaction with the Ross Ice Shelf, and the role of polar ice sheets in global climate change.

References
 

Glaciers of Scott Coast